KTMC may refer to:

 Kwun Tong Maryknoll College, in Hong Kong
 KTMC (AM), a radio station (1400 AM) licensed to McAlester, Oklahoma, United States
 KTMC-FM, a radio station (105.1 FM) licensed to McAlester, Oklahoma
 KTMC - Kukreja Transformer Mfg. Co., a power product company, registered with Indian Government, Delhi, INDIA
 KTMC - Kovai Thumpers Motorcycle Club, Coimbatore, The Oldest motorcycle biking club in coimbatore for Royal Enfield riders. Bullet club in coimbatore.